Beta corolliflora is a species of wild beet in the family Amaranthaceae, native to Turkey, the Transcaucasus, and Iran. It is being studied for its resistance to beet curly top virus in an effort to improve the sugar beet.

References

corolliflora
Flora of Turkey
Flora of the Transcaucasus
Flora of Iran
Plants described in 1975